During the 1937–38 season Associazione Sportiva Ambrosiana-Inter competed in Serie  A, Coppa Italia and Mitropa Cup.

Summary 
The club started Serie A with a surprising 3–3 at Lucca, l'Ambrosiana, managed by Armando Castellazzi, reached the top of the table on ninth round, defeating Juventus. On round 15, the squad won the symbolic campione d'inverno with 4 points over Bologna. The second part of the season is opened with a massive score against Lucchese; on round 22 Juventus grabbed the club, then Inter retake the advantage by 2 points next Sunday. The team took the distance of 3 points on round 26, after the match against Liguria. Following the result of Inter, Juventus lost its game against Trieste and not won the game of Liguria. So, Ambrosiana remained over top in the last round with 39 points, followed by Juventus with 38 and Bologna. The squad clinched the title on final round, winning the match of Bari.

When Ambrosiana beat Bari, Meazza scored five goals in a 9–2 victory. The next week he scored a hat-trick against Lucchese. Along with fellow Inter players Ferraris II, Ferrari, and Locatelli, Meazza was involved in the Azzurri set-up that wins the 1938 World Cup in Paris. Castellazzi with 33 years old became the youngest manager winning the scudetto, a record remained nowadays.

A good performance of the club in Coppa Italia, only stopped by Juventus (0-2) in semifinals, champion of the trophy. In Mitropa Cup the team advanced to Quarterfinals, defeated by Slavia Prague (0-9; 3–1); infamous record of the worst loss game by a score of 9 goals against.

Squad

Added players for Mitropa Cup

Competitions

Serie A

League table

Matches

Coppa Italia

Round of 32

Eightfinals

Quarterfinals

Semifinals

Mitropa Cup

Eightfinals

Quarterfinals

Statistics

Squad Statistics

Players statistics

Appearances
31.Piero Antona 
8.Giuseppe Ballerio 
2.Antonio Bisigato 
34.Carmelo Buonocore 
10.Aldo Campatelli 
5.Enrico Candiani 
9.Piero Colli 
15.Antonio Ferrara 
18.Nicola Ferrara 
35.Giovanni Ferrari 
36.Pietro Ferraris 
26.Annibale Frossi 
3.Emilio Gattoronchieri
34.Ugo Locatelli 
34.Giuseppe Meazza 
2.Ezio Meneghello 
35.Renato Olmi 
38.Giuseppe Peruchetti 
2.Sandro Puppo 
4.Costantino Sala
31.Duilio Setti 
1.Giorgio Barsanti
1.Lorenzo Suber 
1.Bruno Vale

Goalscorers
30.Giuseppe Meazza 
18.Pietro Ferraris 
12.Giovanni Ferrari 
7.Annibale Frossi 
1.Piero Colli 
3.Antonio Ferrara 
3.Nicola Ferrara

See also 
Corriere dello Sport - Stadio Il Littoriale, years 1937 and 1938.
La Stampa, years 1937 and 1938.

References

Bibliography 

.

External links 

Inter Milan seasons
Internazionale Milano
Italian football championship-winning seasons